Muharrem Varlı (born 22 April 1969) is a Turkish politician from the Nationalist Movement Party (MHP), who has served as a Member of Parliament for Adana since 22 July 2007.

Born in Adana, Varlı graduated from Selçuk University Faculty of Arts and Sciences history department. He was self-employed, having worked as a farmer before being elected as a MHP Member of Parliament at the June 2015 general election. He is married with two children and speaks English at a semi-fluent level.

See also
25th Parliament of Turkey

References

External links
 Collection of all relevant news items at Haberler.com
 Collection of all relevant news items at Son Dakika

Nationalist Movement Party politicians
Deputies of Adana
Members of the 25th Parliament of Turkey
Living people
People from Adana
1969 births
Members of the 24th Parliament of Turkey
Members of the 23rd Parliament of Turkey
Members of the 26th Parliament of Turkey